Kletnia-Kolonia  is a village in the administrative district of Gmina Gomunice, within Radomsko County, Łódź Voivodeship, in central Poland.

The village has a population of 130.

References

Kletnia-Kolonia